Satisfied with You is the ninth album released in the US by the British band the Dave Clark Five. It was released in 1966 and contained three hit songs, "Look Before You Leap", "Please Tell Me Why" and "Satisfied with You". The LP hit the Billboard Top 200 and the Cashbox Top 100.

Overview
The album contained ten songs and continued the tendency of its predecessor "Try Too Hard" to offer a wider collage of styles. It included songs in the rock and roll ("Good Lovin'"), country ("Satisfied with You") and waltz ("Please Tell Me Why") styles, as well as expressive ballads ("Go On"). But in fact, it didn't stray from the tried-and-true successful style of the Dave Clark Five and had none of the progressive tendencies of the emerging psychedelic music or anti-war messages. Dave Clark said, "To me our music was to have fun with, to enjoy – not any message. That’s always been my feeling: it makes you feel good." All the songs were composed by members of the band, with the exception of a cover version of the Young Rascals' hit "Good Lovin'". Saxophonist Denis Payton wrote four songs, guitarist Lenny Davidson wrote three songs, and singer and organist Mike Smith wrote two. Dave Clark was credited as co-writer on all of the band's songs, although it is often stated that his contribution is more on the production level.

Release and reception 

The album was released in September 1966 by Epic Records only in the United States. It was released in both mono (LN 24212) and stereo (BN 26212) versions. All recordings were produced by Dave Clark himself. The LP reached number 127 on Billboard and number 85 on Cashbox. The singles sold even better. The UK A-side "Look Before You Leap" reached number 50 in the UK chart and 101 in Billboard. Better received was the US A-side "Please Tell Me Why" (b/w "Look Before You Leap"), which became a Top 5 hit in Canada and number 28 in the US. On June 12, 1966, the group presented both songs on the famous Ed Sullivan television show. The title ballad "Satisfied with You" scored 32 in Canada and 50 in the US. The album was not reissued for a long time until 2019 when Dave Clark released a remastered version on Spotify. 

AllMusic critic Richie Unterberger praised the band members' still strong songwriting inventiveness, but added that the album still only benefited from the previous certainty of success of the British Invasion type of songs.

Track listing

Personnel
The Dave Clark Five
Dave Clark - drums, backing vocals
Mike Smith - keyboards, lead vocals
Lenny Davidson - electric guitars, backing vocals
Rick Huxley - bass guitar, backing vocals
Denis Payton - tenor saxophone,  backing vocals

References

The Dave Clark Five albums
1966 albums
Epic Records albums